Eastern Europe is a subregion of the European continent. As a largely ambiguous term, it has a wide range of geopolitical, geographical, ethnic, cultural, and socio-economic connotations. The vast majority of the region is covered by Russia, which spans roughly 40% of the continent's landmass while accounting for approximately 15% of its total population.

It represents a significant part of European culture; the main socio-cultural characteristics of Eastern Europe have historically been defined by the traditions of Slavs and Greeks, as well as by the influence of Eastern Christianity as it developed through the Eastern Roman Empire and the Ottoman Empire. Another definition was created by the Cold War, as Europe was ideologically divided by the Iron Curtain, with "Eastern Europe" being synonymous with communist states constituting the Eastern Bloc under the influence of the Soviet Union.

The term is sometimes considered to be pejorative, through stereotypes about Eastern Europe being inferior (poorer, less developed) to Western Europe; the term Central and Eastern Europe is sometimes used instead for more neutral grouping.

Definitions

Several definitions of Eastern Europe exist in the early 21st century, but they often lack precision and may be anachronistic. These definitions are debated across cultures and among experts, even political scientists, as the term has a wide range of geopolitical, geographical, cultural, and socioeconomic connotations. It has also been described as a "fuzzy" term, as the idea itself of Eastern Europe is in constant redefinition. The solidification of the idea of an "Eastern Europe" dates back chiefly to the (French) Enlightenment.

There are "almost as many definitions of Eastern Europe as there are scholars of the region". A related United Nations paper adds that "every assessment of spatial identities is essentially a social and cultural construct".

Geographical

While the eastern geographical boundaries of Europe are well defined, the boundary between Eastern and Western Europe is not geographical but historical, religious and cultural and is harder to designate.

The Ural Mountains, Ural River, and the Caucasus Mountains are the geographical land border of the eastern edge of Europe. E.g. Kazakhstan, which is mainly located in Central Asia with the most western parts of it located west of the Ural River also shares a part of Eastern Europe.

In the west, however, the historical and cultural boundaries of "Eastern Europe" are subject to some overlap and, most importantly, have undergone historical fluctuations, which makes a precise definition of the western geographic boundaries of Eastern Europe and the geographical midpoint of Europe somewhat difficult.

Religious and cultural influence

After the East–West Schism in 1054, significant parts of Eastern Europe developed cultural unity and resistance to the Catholic (and later also Protestant) Western Europe within the framework of the Eastern Orthodox Church, Church Slavonic language and the Cyrillic alphabet.

Western Europe according to this point of view is formed by countries with dominant Roman Catholic and Protestant churches (including Central European countries such as Croatia, Slovenia, Austria, the Czech Republic, Germany, Hungary, Poland, Slovakia, Lithuania, Latvia and Estonia).

A large part of Eastern Europe is formed by countries with dominant Orthodox churches, like Armenia, Belarus, Bulgaria, Cyprus, Georgia, Greece, Moldova, Montenegro, North Macedonia, Romania, Russia, Serbia, and Ukraine, for instance. The Eastern Orthodox Church has played a prominent role in the history and culture of Eastern and Southeastern Europe.

The schism is the break of communion and theology between what are now the Eastern (Orthodox) and Western (Roman Catholic from the 11th century, as well as from the 16th century also Protestant) churches. This division dominated Europe for centuries, in opposition to the rather short-lived Cold War division of four decades.

Since the Great Schism of 1054, Europe has been divided between Roman Catholic (and later additionally Protestant) churches in the West, and the Eastern Orthodox Christian (often incorrectly labelled "Greek Orthodox") churches in the east. Due to this religious cleavage, Eastern Orthodox countries are often associated with Eastern Europe. A cleavage of this sort is, however, often problematic; for example, Greece is overwhelmingly Orthodox, but is very rarely included in "Eastern Europe", for a variety of reasons, the most prominent being that Greece's history, for the most part, was more influenced by Mediterranean cultures and contact.

Cold War (1947–1991)

The fall of the Iron Curtain brought the end of the Cold War east–west division in Europe, but this geopolitical concept is sometimes still used for quick reference by the media. Another definition was used during the 40 years of Cold War between 1947 and 1989, and was more or less synonymous with the terms Eastern Bloc and Warsaw Pact. A similar definition names the formerly communist European states outside the Soviet Union as Eastern Europe.

Historians and social scientists generally view such definitions as outdated or relegated.

EuroVoc

EuroVoc, a multilingual thesaurus maintained by the Publications Office of the European Union, has entries for "23 EU languages" classifying Bulgarian, Croatian, Czech, Hungarian, Polish, Romanian, Slovak and Slovenian, plus the languages of candidate countries Albanian, Macedonian and Serbian as Central and Eastern European.

Contemporary developments

Baltic states

UNESCO, EuroVoc, National Geographic Society, Committee for International Cooperation in National Research in Demography, and the STW Thesaurus for Economics place the Baltic states in Northern Europe, whereas the CIA World Factbook places the region in Eastern Europe with a strong assimilation to Northern Europe. They are members of the Nordic-Baltic Eight regional cooperation forum whereas Central European countries formed their own alliance called the Visegrád Group. The Northern Future Forum, the Nordic Investment Bank, the Nordic Battlegroup, the Nordic-Baltic Eight and the New Hanseatic League are other examples of Northern European cooperation that includes the three countries collectively referred to as the Baltic states.
 Estonia
 Latvia
 Lithuania

Caucasus states

The South Caucasus nations of Armenia, Azerbaijan, and Georgia are included in definitions or histories of Eastern Europe. They are located in the transition zone of Eastern Europe and Western Asia. They participate in the European Union's Eastern Partnership program, the Euronest Parliamentary Assembly, and are members of the Council of Europe, which specifies that all three have political and cultural connections to Europe. In January 2002, the European Parliament noted that Armenia and Georgia may enter the EU in the future. However, Georgia is currently the only South Caucasus nation actively seeking NATO and EU membership.
 
 Armenia 
 Azerbaijan
 Georgia

There are three de facto independent Republics with limited recognition in the South Caucasus region. All three states participate in the Community for Democracy and Rights of Nations: 
 Abkhazia
 Artsakh
 South Ossetia

There are seven republics in the North Caucasus that fall under direct Russian political control:
 Adygea
 Chechnya
 Dagestan
 Ingushetia
 Kabardino-Balkaria
 Karachay-Cherkessia
 North Ossetia-Alania

Post-Soviet states

Some European republics of the former Soviet Union are considered a part of Eastern Europe:
 Belarus
 Moldova (sometimes considered a part of the Balkans or Southeast Europe)
 Russia (western portion)
 Ukraine

Unrecognized states:
 Transnistria

Central Europe

The term "Central Europe" is often used by historians to designate states formerly belonging to the Holy Roman Empire, the Austro-Hungarian Empire, and the western portion of Polish–Lithuanian Commonwealth.

In some media, "Central Europe" can thus partially overlap with "Eastern Europe" of the Cold War Era. The following countries are labelled Central European by some commentators, though others still consider them to be Eastern European.
 Czech Republic
 Croatia (can variously be included in Southeastern or Central Europe)
 Hungary
 Poland
 Romania (can variously be included in Southeastern or Central Europe)
 Serbia (mostly placed in Southeastern but sometimes in Central Europe)
 Slovakia
 Slovenia (most often placed in Central Europe but sometimes in Southeastern Europe)

Southeastern Europe

Some countries in Southeast Europe can be considered part of Eastern Europe. Some of them can sometimes, albeit rarely, be characterized as belonging to Southern Europe, and some may also be included in Central Europe.

In some media, "Southeast Europe" can thus partially overlap with "Eastern Europe" of the Cold War Era. The following countries are labelled Southeast European by some commentators, though others still consider them to be Eastern European.

 Albania 
 Bosnia and Herzegovina 
 Bulgaria 
 Cyprus (Geographically located in Asia, though most often considered a part of Southeastern Europe)
 Croatia (can variously be included in Southeastern or Central Europe)
 Greece (Sometimes grouped in Southern Europe with countries like Italy, Spain and Portugal)
 Moldova (usually grouped with the non-Baltic post-Soviet states but sometimes considered part of Southeastern Europe)
 Montenegro
 North Macedonia 
 Romania (can variously be included in Southeastern or Central Europe)
 Serbia (mostly placed in Southeastern but sometimes in Central Europe)
 Slovenia (most often placed in Central Europe but sometimes in Southeast Europe)
 Turkey (East Thrace, the portion west of the Turkish Straits)
 
Partially recognized states:
 Kosovo

Kazakhstan
Despite being frequently classified as a Central Asian country, about 4% of Kazakhstan's territory, west of the Ural River, geographically lies in Eastern Europe, thus making it transcontinental.

History

Classical antiquity and medieval origins

Ancient kingdoms of the region included Orontid Armenia, Caucasian Albania, Colchis and Iberia (not to be confused with the Iberian Peninsula in Western Europe), of which the former two were the predecessor states of Armenia and Azerbaijan respectively, while the latter two were the predecessor states of modern-day Georgia. These peripheral kingdoms were, either from the start or later on, incorporated into various Iranian empires, including the Achaemenid Persian, Parthian, and Sassanid Persian Empires. Parts of the Balkans and some more northern areas were ruled by the Achaemenid Persians as well, including Thrace, Paeonia, Macedon, and most of the Black Sea coastal regions of Romania, Ukraine, and Russia. Owing to the rivalry between the Parthian Empire and Rome, and later between Byzantium and the Sassanid Persians, the Parthians would invade the region several times, although it was never able to hold the area, unlike the Sassanids who controlled most of the Caucasus during their entire rule.
 
The earliest known distinctions between east and west in Europe originate in the history of the Roman Republic. As the Roman domain expanded, a cultural and linguistic division appeared. The mainly Greek-speaking eastern provinces had formed the highly urbanized Hellenistic civilization. In contrast, the western territories largely adopted the Latin language. This cultural and linguistic division was eventually reinforced by the later political east–west division of the Roman Empire. The division between these two spheres deepened during Late Antiquity and the Middle Ages due to a number of events. The Western Roman Empire collapsed in the 5th century, marking the start of the Early Middle Ages. By contrast, the Eastern Roman Empire—the Byzantine Empire—had a survival strategy that kept it alive for another 1,000 years.

The rise of the Frankish Empire in the west, and in particular the Great Schism that formally divided Eastern and Western Christianity in 1054, heightened the cultural and religious distinctiveness between Eastern and Western Europe. Much of Eastern Europe was invaded and occupied by the Mongols.

During the Ostsiedlung, towns founded under Magdeburg rights became centers of economic development and scattered German settlements were founded all over Eastern Europe. Introduction of German town law is often seen as a second great step after introduction of Christianity at the turn of the first and second millennia. The ensuing modernization of society and economy allowed the increased role played by the rulers of Poland, Bohemia, and Hungary.

1453 to 1918
The conquest of the Byzantine Empire, center of the Eastern Orthodox Church, by the Ottoman Empire in the 15th century, and the gradual fragmentation of the Holy Roman Empire (which had replaced the Frankish empire) led to a change of the importance of Roman Catholic/Protestant vs. Eastern Orthodox concept in Europe. Armour points out that Cyrillic-alphabet use is not a strict determinant for Eastern Europe, where from Croatia to Poland and everywhere in between, the Latin alphabet is used. Greece's status as the cradle of Western civilization and an integral part of the Western world in the political, cultural and economic spheres has led to it being nearly always classified as belonging not to Eastern, but Southern or Western Europe. During the late-sixteenth and early-seventeenth centuries, Eastern Europe enjoyed a relatively high standard of living. This period is also called the east-central European golden age of around 1600. At the beginning of the 17th century, numeracy levels in eastern Europe were relatively low, although regional differences existed. During the 18th century, the regions began to catch up with western Europe, but did not develop as rapidly. Areas with stronger female autonomy developed more quickly in terms of numeracy.

Serfdom
Serfdom was a prevalent status of agricultural workers until the 19th century. It resembled slavery in terms of lack of freedom, however the landowners could not buy and sell serfs, who are permanently attached to specific plots of land. The system emerged in the 14th and 15th century, the same time it was declining in Western Europe. The climax came in the 17th and 18th century. The early 19th century saw its decline, marked especially by the abolition of serfdom in Russia in 1861. Emancipation meant that the ex-serfs paid for their freedom with annual cash payments to their former masters for decades. The system varied widely country by country, and was not as standardized as in Western Europe. Historians, until the 20th century, focused on master-serf economic and labor relations, portraying the serfs as slave-like, passive, and isolated. 20th century scholars downplayed the evils and emphasize the complexities.

Interwar period (1919–1939)

A major result of the First World War was the breakup of the Russian, Austro-Hungarian, and Ottoman empires, as well as partial losses to the German Empire. A surge of ethnic nationalism created a series of new states in Eastern Europe, validated by the Versailles Treaty of 1919. Poland was reconstituted after the partitions of the 1790s had divided it between Germany, Austria, and Russia. New countries included Finland, Estonia, Latvia, Lithuania, Ukraine (which was soon absorbed by the Soviet Union), Czechoslovakia, and Yugoslavia. Austria and Hungary had much-reduced boundaries. The new states included sizeable ethnic minorities, which were to be protected according to the League of Nations minority protection regime. Throughout Eastern Europe, ethnic Germans constituted by far the largest single ethnic minority. In some areas, as in the Sudetenland, regions of Poland, and in parts of Slovenia, German speakers constituted the local majority, creating upheaval regarding demands of self-determination.

Romania, Bulgaria, and Albania likewise were independent. Many of the countries were still largely rural, with little industry and only a few urban centres. Nationalism was the dominant force but most of the countries had ethnic or religious minorities who felt threatened by majority elements. Nearly all became democratic in the 1920s, but all of them (except Czechoslovakia and Finland) gave up democracy during the depression years of the 1930s, in favor of autocratic, strong-man or single-party states. The new states were unable to form stable military alliances, and one by one were too weak to stand up against Nazi Germany or the Soviet Union, which took them over between 1938 and 1945.

World War II and onset of the Cold War
Russia ended its participation in the First World War in March 1918 and lost territory, as the Baltic countries and Poland became independent. The region was the main battlefield in the Second World War (1939–45), with German and Soviet armies sweeping back and forth, with millions of Jews killed by the Nazis, and millions of others killed by disease, starvation, and military action, or executed after being deemed as politically dangerous. During the final stages of World War II the future of Eastern Europe was decided by the overwhelming power of the Soviet Red Army, as it swept the Germans aside. It did not reach Yugoslavia and Albania, however. Finland was free but forced to be neutral in the upcoming Cold War.

Throughout Eastern Europe, German-speaking populations were expelled to the reduced borders of Germany in one of the largest ethnic cleansing operations in history. Regions where Germans had formed the local population majority were re-settled with Polish- or Czech-speakers.

The region fell to Soviet control and Communist governments were imposed. Yugoslavia and Albania had their own Communist regimes independent of Moscow. The Eastern Bloc at the onset of the Cold War in 1947 was far behind the Western European countries in economic rebuilding and economic progress. Winston Churchill, in his famous "Sinews of Peace" address of 5 March 1946, at Westminster College in Fulton, Missouri, stressed the geopolitical impact of the "iron curtain":

Eastern Bloc

Eastern Europe after 1945 usually meant all the European countries liberated from Nazi Germany and then occupied by the Soviet army. It included the German Democratic Republic (also known as East Germany), formed by the Soviet occupation zone of Germany. All the countries in Eastern Europe adopted communist modes of control by 1948. These countries were officially independent of the Soviet Union, but the practical extent of this independence was quite limited. Yugoslavia and Albania had Communist control that was independent of the Kremlin.

The communists had a natural reservoir of popularity in that they had destroyed the Nazi invaders. Their goal was to guarantee long-term working-class solidarity. The Soviet secret police, the NKVD, working in collaboration with local communists, created secret police forces using leadership trained in Moscow. This new secret police arrived to arrest political enemies according to prepared lists. The national Communists then took power in a gradualist manner, backed by the Soviets in many, but not all, cases. For a while, cooperative non-Communist parties were tolerated. The Communist governments nationalized private businesses, placing them under state ownership, and monitored the media and churches. When dividing up government offices with coalition partners, the Communists took control of the interior ministries, which controlled the local police. They also took control of the mass media, especially radio, as well as the education system. They confiscated and redistributed farmland, and seized control of or replaced the organizations of civil society, such as church groups, sports, youth groups, trade unions, farmers' organizations, and civic organizations. In some countries, they engaged in large-scale ethnic cleansing, moving ethnic groups such as Germans, Poles, Ukrainians and Hungarians far away from where they previously lived, often with high loss of life, to relocate them within the new post-war borders of their respective countries.

Under pressure from Stalin, these nations rejected grants from the American Marshall Plan. Instead, they participated in the Molotov Plan, which later evolved into the Comecon (Council for Mutual Economic Assistance). When NATO was created in 1949, most countries of Eastern Europe became members of the opposing Warsaw Pact, forming a geopolitical concept that became known as the Eastern Bloc. This consisted of:
 First and foremost was the Soviet Union (which included the modern-day territories of Russia, Belarus, Ukraine and Moldova and the illegally occupied Lithuania, Latvia and Estonia). Other countries dominated by the Soviet Union were the German Democratic Republic, People's Republic of Poland, Czechoslovak Socialist Republic, People's Republic of Hungary, People's Republic of Bulgaria, and Socialist Republic of Romania.
 The Socialist Federal Republic of Yugoslavia (SFRY; formed after World War II and before its later dismemberment) was not a member of the Warsaw Pact. It was a founding member of the Non-Aligned Movement, an organization created in an attempt to avoid being assigned to either the NATO or Warsaw Pact blocs. The movement was demonstratively independent of both the Soviet Union and the Western bloc for most of the Cold War period, allowing Yugoslavia and its other members to act as a business and political mediator between the blocs.
 The Socialist People's Republic of Albania broke with the Soviet Union in the early 1960s as a result of the Sino-Soviet split, aligning itself instead with China. Albania formally left the Warsaw pact in September 1968 after the suppression of the Prague Spring. When China established diplomatic relations with the United States in 1978, Albania also broke away from China. Albania and especially Yugoslavia were not unanimously appended to the Eastern Bloc, as they were neutral for a large part of the Cold War period.

Since 1989

 
With the fall of the Iron Curtain in 1989, the political landscape of the Eastern Bloc, and indeed the world, changed. In the German reunification, the Federal Republic of Germany peacefully absorbed the German Democratic Republic in 1990. In 1991, COMECON, the Warsaw Pact, and the Soviet Union were dissolved. Many European nations that had been part of the Soviet Union declared or regained their independence (Belarus, Moldova, Ukraine, as well as the Baltic States of Latvia, Lithuania, and Estonia). Czechoslovakia peacefully separated into the Czech Republic and Slovakia in 1993. Many countries of this region joined the European Union, namely Bulgaria, the Czech Republic, Croatia, Estonia, Hungary, Latvia, Lithuania, Poland, Romania, Slovakia and Slovenia. The term "EU11 countries" refer to the Central and Eastern European member states, including the Baltic states, that accessed in 2004 and after: in 2004 the Czech Republic, Estonia, Latvia, Lithuania, Hungary, Poland, Slovenia, and the Slovak Republic; in 2007 Bulgaria, Romania; and in 2013 Croatia.

The economic changes were in harmony with the constitutional reforms: constitutional provisions on public finances can be identified and, in some countries, a separate chapter deals with public finances. Generally, they soon encountered the following problems: high inflation, high unemployment, low economic growth, and high government debt. By 2000 these economies were stabilized, and between 2004 and 2013 all of them joined the European Union. Most of the constitutions define directly or indirectly the economic system of the countries parallel to the democratic transition of the 1990s: free-market economy (sometimes complemented with the socially [and ecologically] oriented sector), economic development, or only economic rights are included as a ground for the economy.

In the case of fiscal policy, the legislative, the executive and other state organs (Budget Council, Economic and Social Council) define and manage the budgeting. The average government debt in the countries is nearly 44%, but the deviation is great because the lowest figure is close to 10% but the highest is 97%. The trend shows that the sovereign debt ratio to GDP in most countries has been rising. Only three countries are affected by high government debt: Croatia, Hungary and Slovenia (over 70% of the GDP), while Slovakia and Poland fulfill the Maastricht requirement but only 10% below the threshold. The contribution to cover the finances for common needs is declared, the principle of just tax burden-sharing is supplemented sometimes with special aspects. Tax revenues expose typically 15–19 % of the GDP, and rates above 20% only rarely can be found.

The state audit of the government budget and expenditures is an essential control element in public finances and an important part of the concept of checks and balances. The central banks are independent state institutions, which possess a monopoly on managing and implementing a state's or federation's monetary policy. Besides monetary policy, some of them even perform the supervision of the financial intermediary system. In the case of a price stability function, the inflation rate, in the examined area, relatively quickly dropped to below 5% by 2000. In monetary policy the differences are based on the euro-zone: Estonia, Latvia, Lithuania, Slovakia, Slovenia use the common currency. The economies of this decade – similar to the previous one – show a moderate inflation. As a new phenomenon, a slight negative inflation (deflation) appeared in this decade in several countries (Croatia, Estonia, Hungary, Poland, Romania, Slovakia, and Slovenia), which demonstrates sensitivity regarding international developments. The majority of the constitutions determine the national currency, legal tender or monetary unit. The local currency exchange rate to the U.S. dollar shows that drastic interventions were not necessary. National wealth or assets are the property of the state and/or local governments and, as an exclusive property, the management and protection of them aim at serving the public interest.

Demographics

See also

 Community for Democracy and Rights of Nations
 Eastern European Group
 Eastern Partnership
 Enlargement of the European Union
 Eurasian Economic Union
 Euronest Parliamentary Assembly
 European Union
 European Russia
 Eurovoc
 Future enlargement of the European Union
 Geography of the Soviet Union
 Intermarium
 List of Intangible Cultural Heritage elements in Eastern Europe
 List of political parties in Eastern Europe
 Organization of the Black Sea Economic Cooperation
 Post-Soviet States

European subregions
 Eurovoc#Eastern Europe
 East-Central Europe
 Central Europe
 Central and Eastern Europe
 Northern Europe
 Southeast Europe
 Western Europe
 Geographical midpoint of Europe
 Regions of Europe

References

Further reading

 Applebaum, Anne. Iron Curtain: The Crushing of Eastern Europe, 1944–1956 (2012)
 Berend, Iván T. Decades of Crisis: Central and Eastern Europe before World War II (2001)
 
 Day, Alan J. et al. A Political and Economic Dictionary of Eastern Europe (2nd ed 2007) abstract
 Donert, Celia, Emily Greble, and Jessica Wardhaugh. "New Scholarship on Central and Eastern Europe." Contemporary European History 26.3 (2017): 507-507. DOI: New Scholarship on Central and Eastern Europe
 Frankel, Benjamin. The Cold War 1945-1991. Vol. 2, Leaders and other important figures in the Soviet Union, Eastern Europe, China, and the Third World (1992), 379pp of biographies.
 Frucht, Richard, ed. Encyclopedia of Eastern Europe: From the Congress of Vienna to the Fall of Communism (2000)
 Fuchs-Schündeln, Nicola, and Matthias Schündeln. "The long-term effects of communism in Eastern Europe." Journal of Economic Perspectives 34.2 (2020): 172–91. online
 Gal, Susan and Gail Kligman, The Politics of Gender After Socialism (Princeton University Press, 2000).
 Gorshkov, Boris B. "Serfdom: Eastern Europe." in Encyclopedia of European Social History, edited by Peter N. Stearns, (vol. 2: 2001), pp. 379–388. Online
 Ghodsee, Kristen R. Lost in Transition: Ethnographies of Everyday Life After Communism (Duke University Press, 2011).
 Held, Joseph, ed. The Columbia History of Eastern Europe in the Twentieth Century (1993)
 Jeffries, Ian, and Robert Bideleux. The Balkans: A Post-Communist History (2007).
 
 Jelavich, Barbara. History of the Balkans, Vol. 1: Eighteenth and Nineteenth Centuries (1983)
 
 
 
 Ramet, Sabrina P. Eastern Europe: Politics, Culture, and Society Since 1939 (1999)
 Roskin, Michael G. The Rebirth of East Europe (4th ed. 2001); 204pp
 Schenk, Frithjof Benjamin, Mental Maps: The Cognitive Mapping of the Continent as an Object of Research of European History, EGO - European History Online, Mainz: Institute of European History, 2013, retrieved: March 4, 2020 (pdf).
 Schevill, Ferdinand. The History of the Balkan Peninsula; From the Earliest Times to the Present Day (1966)
 Seton-Watson, Hugh. Eastern Europe Between the Wars 1918-1941 (1945) online
 Simons, Thomas W. Eastern Europe in the Postwar World (1991)
 Snyder, Timothy. Bloodlands: Europe Between Hitler and Stalin (2011)
 
 Stavrianos, L.S.  The Balkans Since 1453 (1958), major scholarly history; online free to borrow
 Swain, Geoffrey and Nigel Swain, Eastern Europe Since 1945 (3rd ed. 2003)
 Verdery, Katherine. What Was Socialism and What Comes Next? Princeton: Princeton University Press, 1996.
 
 Walters, E. Garrison. The Other Europe: Eastern Europe to 1945 (1988) 430pp; country-by-country coverage
 Wolchik, Sharon L. and Jane L. Curry, eds. Central and East European Politics: From Communism to Democracy (2nd ed. 2010), 432pp
 Wolff, Larry: Inventing Eastern Europe: The Map of Civilization on the Mind of the Enlightenment. Stanford: Stanford University Press, 1994.

External links

 Interview with historian Larry Wolff on "Inventing Eastern Europe"
 Eastern Europe Economic Data
 Emerging Europe - A new narrative for the region

 

 
Regions of Europe